Etna is an unincorporated community in Pulaski County, Kentucky, United States. It lies at an elevation of 1083 feet (330 m).

References

Unincorporated communities in Pulaski County, Kentucky
Unincorporated communities in Kentucky